Edmund Pettus (1821–1907) was a U.S. Senator from Alabama from 1897 to 1907. 

Senator Pettus may also refer to:

John J. Pettus (1813–1867), Mississippi State Senate
William Grymes Pettus (1794–1867), Missouri State Senate

See also

 Pettus (disambiguation)
 Senator (disambiguation)